Isotropis  is a genus of flowering plants in the family Fabaceae. The genus is endemic to Australia.

Species
Isotropis comprises the following species:
Isotropis atropurpurea F.Muell. – Poison Sage
Isotropis browniae Jobson
Isotropis canescens F.Muell.
Isotropis centralis Maconochie
Isotropis cuneifolia (Sm.) Heynh.—Granny Bonnets
Isotropis drummondii Meisn.—Lamb Poison 
Isotropis faucicola Jobson
Isotropis filicaulis Benth.
Isotropis foliosa Crisp
Isotropis forrestii F.Muell. 
Isotropis juncea Turcz.—Slender Lamb Poison
Isotropis parviflora Benth.

Isotropis wheeleri Benth.
Isotropis winneckei F.Muell.

Species names with uncertain taxonomic status
The status of the following species is unresolved:
 Isotropis argentea Ewart & Morrison
 Isotropis biloba Benth.
 Isotropis striata Benth.
 Isotropis winneckeana F. Muell.

References

Mirbelioids
Fabaceae genera
Fabales of Australia